Maddy or Maddie is a shortened form of the feminine given names Madeleine, Madelyn, Madison, etc.

People
 Maddy Crippen (born 1980), American medley swimmer
 Maddy English (1925–2004), American professional baseball player
 Maddy Evans (born 1991), American soccer player
 Maddy Hill (born 1990), English actress
 Maddie Moate (born 1988), English TV presenter and YouTube filmmaker 
 Maddie Poppe (born 1997), American singer-songwriter, 16th winner of American Idol (2018)
 Maddy Prior (born 1947), English folk singer
 Maddie Rooney (ice hockey) (born 1997), American ice hockey player
 Maddy Rosenberg (born 1956), American artist and curator
 Maddy Scott (born 1991), Canadian person who has been missing since 2011
 Maddie Ziegler (born 2002), American dancer

Fictional characters
 Madalyn "Maddie" Bishop, main character of the 2018 show Siren
 Madeline "Maddie" Kendall-Buckley, a 9-1-1 dispatcher on American television series 9-1-1
 Maddie Fenton, on the Nickelodeon show Danny Phantom
 Maddy Ferguson, on the U.S. television series Twin Peaks
 Maddie Fitzpatrick, on the Disney television series The Suite Life of Zack and Cody
 Maddie Flour, from the Disney Channel animated series Amphibia
 Maddie Hayes, on the U.S. television series Moonlighting, role played by Cybill Shepherd
 Maddie Heath, on the UK television show Coronation Street
 Maddie Magellan, a lead character in the UK television show Jonathan Creek
 Maddy Osborne, on the Australian soap opera Home and Away
 Maddy Perez, a main character of the US HBO television show Euphoria
 Maddie Rooney, from the Disney Channel program Liv and Maddie, played by Dove Cameron
 Maddy Young, from the BBC medical drama Holby City
 Maddie, inland taipan protagonist of Back to the Outback

See also

 

Feminine given names
Hypocorisms